Jason Stoltenberg and Todd Woodbridge were the two-time defending champions, but Stoltenberg did not compete. Woodbridge played with Johan Anderson but lost in the semifinals to John-Laffnie de Jager and Wayne Ferreira.

Jared Palmer and Jonathan Stark defeated de Jager and Ferreira in the final, 7–6(7–4), 7–6(7–2) to win the boys' doubles tennis title at the 1989 Wimbledon Championships.

Seeds

  Johan Anderson /  Todd Woodbridge (semifinals)
  Jared Palmer /  Jonathan Stark (champions)
  Ola Kristiansson /  Nicklas Kulti (quarterfinals)
  John-Laffnie de Jager /  Wayne Ferreira (final)
  Jamie Morgan /  Bret Richardson (quarterfinals)
  Martin Damm /  David Rikl (semifinals)
  Pedro Alatorre /  Mark Knowles (quarterfinals)
  Jan Kodeš /  Martin Stringari (second round)

Draw

Finals

Top half

Bottom half

References

External links

Boys' Doubles
Wimbledon Championship by year – Boys' doubles